Burton is a constituency represented in the House of Commons of the Parliament of the United Kingdom. It elects one Member of Parliament (MP) by the first past the post system of election.

History
The constituency was created in 1885 replacing the previous East Staffordshire and North Staffordshire constituencies. Burton upon Trent is a centre of the brewing industry and for sixty years from 1885 to 1945, the MPs were from brewery-owning families. Despite the working class nature of Burton upon Trent from 1950 to 1997, the seat was held by the Conservative Party, albeit often with relatively small majorities. Traditionally the brewing industry has been a strong supporter of the Conservative Party. However, like many traditionally Conservative seats, it was lost to the Labour Party at the 1997 general election, which they won in a landslide. Janet Dean retained the seat until 2010, when the Conservatives retook it.

Boundaries

This constituency covers most of the East Staffordshire district.  The main town is Burton upon Trent, while it also includes Uttoxeter, Tutbury and Rocester.  The remaining small part of East Staffordshire, the area around Abbots Bromley and Yoxall, and, from the 2010 general election (following a review by the Boundary Commission for England), the Needwood ward (containing the village of Barton-under-Needwood), is in the Lichfield constituency.

Members of Parliament

Elections

Elections in the 2010s

Elections in the 2000s

Elections in the 1990s

Elections in the 1980s

Elections in the 1970s

Elections in the 1960s

Elections in the 1950s

Election in the 1940s

Elections in the 1930s

Elections in the 1920s

Election results 1885–1918

Elections in the 1910s

General Election 1914–15:
Another General Election was required to take place before the end of 1915. The political parties had been making preparations for an election to take place and by July 1914, the following candidates had been selected; 
Unionist: Robert Ratcliff
Liberal:

Elections in the 1900s

Elections in the 1890s

Elections in the 1880s

 Caused by Bass' elevation to the peerage, becoming Lord Burton.

See also
List of parliamentary constituencies in Staffordshire

References

External links 
nomis Constituency Profile for Burton — presenting data from the ONS annual population survey and other official statistics.

Parliamentary constituencies in Staffordshire
Borough of East Staffordshire
Constituencies of the Parliament of the United Kingdom established in 1885
Burton upon Trent